Dead Vent 7 is an album by Single Cell Orchestra. It was released in 1995 on Reflective Records. The album closely resembles a radio drama, with a variety of actors voicing the roles of a deep-space military crew involved in an Alien-like space opera.  This tale of spaceships, an unseen enemy, and the participants' eventual demise features narration by Miguel Fierro and friends, as well as Fierro's synthesizer-based bleeps, drones, and rhythms.

Track listing
"The Portal"
"Approaching DSS-723"
"Comsat"
"Dimea Battlestation"
"Science Officer Porter to Team Recon"
"Silo Master Control"
"Access Seraphim Flight Log"

Plot
In the distant future, a military team is sent to investigate the disappearance of a Dead Vent 7 operative in a vessel that has been overrun by an alien presence.

References

External links

1995 debut albums
Ambient techno albums
Single Cell Orchestra albums